Wayne Hoffman is an American author and journalist.

Hoffman has contributed to The Village Voice, The Huffington Post, The Washington Post, The Advocate, Hadassah Magazine, and The New York Blade. He was managing editor at Billboard until 2003, and later held the same post at The Jewish Daily Forward.  he is deputy editor at Nextbook Press, a New York-based Jewish small press, in which capacity he also serves as managing editor for Tablet Magazine.

Hoffman is a graduate of Tufts University and New York University. He is married to fellow journalist Mark Sullivan.

His second novel, Sweet Like Sugar, received the Barbara Gittings Literature Award as part of the 2012 Stonewall Book Awards.

Bibliography
Hard: A Novel (2006)
Policing Public Sex: Queer Politics and the Future of AIDS Activism (1996) (as editor)
What We Brought Back: Jewish Life After Birthright (2010) (as editor)
Sweet Like Sugar (2011)
An Older Man (2015)

References

External links
Profile at Tablet Magazine

21st-century American novelists
American male novelists
Living people
American book editors
American magazine editors
American gay writers
American LGBT novelists
Tufts University alumni
New York University alumni
21st-century American male writers
21st-century American non-fiction writers
American male non-fiction writers
Year of birth missing (living people)
Stonewall Book Award winners